Abraham Octavianus Atururi (13 October 1951 – 21 September 2019) was an Indonesian politician. He was born in the province of Papua, and served as governor of the West Papua province from 2006 to 2017.

Dates of rank

Awards 

  Military Long Service Medals, 4th Category
  Military Long Service Medals, 3rd Category
  Military Long Service Medals, 2nd Category
  Timor Military Campaign Medal
  Navy Meritorious Service Star, 3rd Class
  Star of Mahaputera, 2nd Class (13 August 2014)

References

1951 births
Papuan people
2019 deaths
People from Yapen Islands Regency
Indonesian Roman Catholics
Governors of West Papua (province)
Vice Governors of Irian Jaya